Taconic Shores is a residential development and census-designated place (CDP) in Columbia County, New York, United States. The hamlet is near the geographic center of the town of Copake and surrounds Robinson Pond, a water body on the Roeliff Jansen Kill. The CDP was designated after the 2010 census, so no population figure is yet available.

Geography
Taconic Shores consists of a housing development surrounding Robinson Pond, part of the Roeliff Jansen Kill, a stream which flows west to the Hudson River. The community is just north of Copake Hamlet and the Copake Town Hall.

Demographics

References

External links
Taconic Shores Property Owners Association

Census-designated places in New York (state)
Census-designated places in Columbia County, New York